Plasmodium pessoai is a parasite of the genus Plasmodium. As in all Plasmodium species, P. pessoai has both vertebrate and insect hosts. The vertebrate hosts for this parasite are reptiles.

Taxonomy 
The parasite was first described by Ayala et al. in 1978. The species is named after Dr Samuel B Pessoa - a parasitologist at the Instituto Butantan, São Paulo, Brazil.

Morphologically this species appears to be related to Plasmodium aurulentum.

Description 
The gametocytes are small and sausage shaped  (10.4 x 4.6 micrometres)

Immature schizonts often contain a digestive vacuole.

Mature schizonts are spherical or bouquet-shaped and produce 22 - 32 merozoites. They may possess an intensely staining magenta or rose-coloured substance in the matrix of the
surrounding vacuole.

Distribution 
This species is found in Costa Rica, Central America.

Hosts 
Plasmodium pessoai is one of the three species known to infect snakes: the other two are Plasmodium wenyoni and Plasmodium tomodoni. This species infects the rat snake (Spilotes pullatus) and the bush master (Lachesis muta).

References 

pessoai